In mathematics, the Bloch group is a cohomology group of the Bloch–Suslin complex, named after Spencer Bloch and Andrei Suslin. It is closely related to polylogarithm, hyperbolic geometry and algebraic K-theory.

Bloch–Wigner function

The dilogarithm function is the function defined by the power series

It can be extended by analytic continuation, where the path of integration avoids the cut from 1 to +∞

The Bloch–Wigner function is related to dilogarithm function by

, if 

This function enjoys several remarkable properties, e.g.

 is real analytic on 

The last equation is a variance of Abel's functional equation for the dilogarithm .

Definition

Let K be a field and define  as the free abelian group generated by symbols [x]. Abel's functional equation implies that D2 vanishes on the subgroup D(K) of Z(K) generated by elements

Denote by A (K) the factor-group of Z (K) by the subgroup D(K). The Bloch-Suslin complex is defined as the following cochain complex, concentrated in degrees one and two
, where ,

then the Bloch group was defined by Bloch 

The Bloch–Suslin complex can be extended to be an exact sequence

This assertion is due to the Matsumoto theorem on K2 for fields.

Relations between K3 and the Bloch group

If c denotes the element  and the field is infinite, Suslin proved  the element c does not depend on the choice of x, and

where GM(K) is the subgroup of GL(K), consisting of monomial matrices, and BGM(K)+ is the Quillen's plus-construction. Moreover, let K3M denote the Milnor's K-group, then there exists an exact sequence

where K3(K)ind = coker(K3M(K) → K3(K)) and Tor(K*, K*)~ is the unique nontrivial extension of Tor(K*, K*) by means of Z/2.

Relations to hyperbolic geometry in three-dimensions 

A tetrahedron, all of whose vertices are at infinity, is called an ideal tetrahedron. Then under the appropriate metric up to constants we can obtain its cross-ratio:

In particular,  .

In addition, given a hyperbolic manifold  , one can decompose

Here  is the cross-ratio of the vertices of the tetrahedron. Thus the volume of the tetrahedron depends only one single parameter  .  showed that for ideal tetrahedron  ,  where  is the Bloch-Wigner dilogarithm. For general hyperbolic 3-manifold one obtains

by gluing them.

Generalizations

Via substituting dilogarithm by trilogarithm or even higher polylogarithms, the notion of Bloch group was extended by Goncharov  and Zagier . It is widely conjectured that those generalized Bloch groups Bn should be related to algebraic K-theory or motivic cohomology. There are also generalizations of the Bloch group in other directions, for example, the extended Bloch group defined by Neumann .

References

  (this 1826 manuscript was only published posthumously.)
 
 
 
 
 
 

Algebraic topology